The Samsung Focus S is a slate smartphone that runs Microsoft's Windows Phone 7.5 (code-named "Mango") operating system. It is the successor to the Samsung Focus, and was released on November 6, 2011, in the United States. Currently, the Focus S is available exclusively through AT&T.

Hardware and Display 
The display is a 4.3-inch, WVGA (480 x 800 pixel) display. Unlike some former models, it uses a standard RGB layout instead of PenTile. The display has a high viewing angle.  Below the display are three capacitive buttons for back, Start, and search, as seen on most Windows Phones. Above it is the earpiece, light sensors, and  afront-facing camera. The sides of the phone are home to a dual-stage camera key, power/sleep/unlock key (right side), and volume rocker (left side).

The Samsung Focus S is powered by a 1.4 GHz Qualcomm processor.

Software 
The device ships with Windows Phone 7.5 and can be upgraded to Windows Phone Tango (build 8773).

Languages 
Unlike its Android counterpart, the Samsung Galaxy S II, the Focus S supports more languages out of the box.

 Czech
 Danish
 German (Germany)
 German (Austria)
 German (Switzerland)
 English (Australia)
 English (Ireland)
 English (New Zealand)
 English (South Africa)
 English (United Kingdom)
 English (United States)
 Spanish (Spain)
 Spanish (United States)
 French (France)
 French (Switzerland)
 Italian
 Hungarian
 Dutch (Belgium)
 Dutch (Netherlands)
 Norwegian Bokmål
 Polish
 Portuguese (Brazil)
 Portuguese (Portugal)
 Finnish
 Swedish
 Greek
 Russian
 Korean
 Chinese (Simplified)
 Chinese (Traditional)
 Japanese

References

External links
 Official Samsung Focus S homepage

Windows Phone devices
Samsung smartphones
Mobile phones introduced in 2011